Alexandre Pinheiro Porto Aquino, known as Alex Porto (born 21 May 1986) is a Brazilian football player who plays for Vizela. He also holds Portuguese citizenship.

Club career
He made his professional debut in the Campeonato Mineiro for Boa on 27 February 2010 in a game against Cruzeiro.

References

1986 births
Sportspeople from Tocantins
Living people
Brazilian footballers
Clube Recreativo e Atlético Catalano players
F.C. Penafiel players
Boa Esporte Clube players
Tocantins Futebol Clube players
F.C. Felgueiras 1932 players
Académico de Viseu F.C. players
Liga Portugal 2 players
F.C. Vizela players
Brazilian people of Portuguese descent
Association football midfielders